Gavarnie-Gèdre is a commune in the department of Hautes-Pyrénées, southwestern France. The municipality was established on 1 January 2016 by merger of the former communes of Gavarnie and Gèdre.

Geography

Climate

Gavarnie-Gèdre has an oceanic climate (Köppen climate classification Cfb).

Landmarks 
The place is famed primarily for the Cirque de Gavarnie, which is a glacial valley. The southern border is on the mountains, with Aragon, Spain.

In the village of Gavarnie is a small church. The church, built around the 12th Century, lies on the Camino route. The church contains a cabinet which claims to hold the skulls of a number of the Knights Templar who died whilst traveling to Compostela. The church was an influential factor in the listing of the village of Gavarnie as a UNESCO World Heritage Site. The village is visited by those who ski and by HCPT Pilgrimages to Lourdes.

See also 
Communes of the Hautes-Pyrénées department

References

Communes of Hautes-Pyrénées
Populated places established in 2016
2016 establishments in France